Gennaro Esposito (born 18 March 1985) is an Italian football player who plays for Prima Categoria club Real Anacapri.

Career
Previously Esposito played for his hometown side Napoli and made his professional debut for them in Serie B.

Since joining Siena in 2004, Esposito was loaned out twice to Torres and Juve Stabia respectively to gain experience. He eventually made his debut for Siena in Serie A against AC Milan during January 2006.

In August 2007, he was offered a new contract last until June 2010.

In August 2008 he was on loan to Gallipoli Calcio in Lega Pro Prima Divisione. He won the champion and promotion to Serie B with club.

He joined Hellas Verona at Prima Divisione in July 2009.

On 26 August 2013 he moved to Lega Pro Prima Divisione club Salernitana.

On 13 August 2018, he joined Eccellenza (fifth-tier) club Casarano.

Honours
Lega Pro Prima Divisione: 2009

References

External links

Italian footballers
S.S.C. Napoli players
A.C.N. Siena 1904 players
S.S. Juve Stabia players
A.C. Cesena players
A.S.D. Gallipoli Football 1909 players
Hellas Verona F.C. players
A.C. Perugia Calcio players
U.S. Salernitana 1919 players
Venezia F.C. players
Potenza Calcio players
Serie A players
Serie B players
Serie C players
Serie D players
Association football midfielders
Footballers from Naples
1985 births
Living people